Nacer Mohamed Medjoudj (born 8 July 1977 in Constantine, Algeria) is an Algerian former professional footballer who played as a midfielder for Veikkausliiga club HJK Helsinki in Finland and for CS Constantine, JS Kabylie and USM Blida in his native country.

References

External links
 
 

1977 births
Living people
Algerian footballers
Association football midfielders
Veikkausliiga players
JS Kabylie players
CS Constantine players
USM Blida players
Helsingin Jalkapalloklubi players
Algerian expatriate footballers
Algerian expatriate sportspeople in Finland
Expatriate footballers in Finland
21st-century Algerian people